The tenth season of the American television medical drama Grey's Anatomy premiered on September 26, 2013, with a two-hour special episode in the United States on the American Broadcasting Company (ABC), and it concluded with a Farewell To Cristina finale episode "Fear (Of The Unknown)" on May 15, 2014. The season was produced by ABC Studios, in association with Shondaland Production Company and The Mark Gordon Company; the showrunners being Tony Phelan and Joan Rater. The season was officially released on DVD as a 6-disc box-set under the title of Grey's Anatomy: The Complete Tenth Season – Live For The Moments on September 2, 2014 by Buena Vista Home Entertainment.

The season mainly focuses on the relationship between the show's protagonist Meredith Grey (Ellen Pompeo) and "her person" Cristina Yang (Sandra Oh) as both follow different paths relating their careers straining their relationship. Derek Shepherd (Patrick Dempsey) and Callie Torres (Sara Ramirez), having separated from her wife Arizona Robbins (Jessica Capshaw), teamed up with the White House to work on a brain mapping project. Miranda Bailey (Chandra Wilson) was on a project mapping out the human genome. Yang and Owen Hunt (Kevin McKidd) gradually take their relationship from complicated and painful to a place of real friendship. April Kepner (Sarah Drew) and Jackson Avery (Jesse Williams) elope during Kepner and paramedic Matthew Taylor's (Justin Bruening) wedding. Yang takes off to Switzerland for a job offer to take over Preston Burke's (Isaiah Washington) hospital because he wants to step down and move his family. She bids her farewell to her colleagues of the last 7 years, including Hunt and dances it out with Meredith one last time to an old favorite song. Caterina Scorsone begins portraying the role of Dr. Amelia Shepherd in a recurring capacity, as Amelia visits Meredith and her brother at their home and helps take care of their children. She is upgraded to a series regular in season 11 following her decision to move to Seattle full-time.

The season, garnered 12.12 million viewers average viewers and was ranked #15 overall in total viewers which is 11 spots higher than the previous season. In the 18-49 key demographic, it ranked #5 and for the 2013-2014 primetime TV schedule, Grey's was the #1 drama in the 18-49 key demographic. James Pickens, Jr. and Chandra Wilson were nominated for Outstanding Actor and Outstanding Actress respectively at the 45th NAACP Image Awards. The show also garnered 5 nominations at the 40th People's Choice Awards. It was announced on May 8, 2014, by ABC that Grey's Anatomy would return in the fall of 2014 for an eleventh season.

Episodes 

The number in the "No. overall" column refers to the episode's number within the overall series, whereas the number in the "No. in season" column refers to the episode's number within this particular season. "U.S. viewers in millions" refers to the number of Americans in millions who watched the episodes live. Each episode of this season is named after a song.

Cast and characters

Main 
 Ellen Pompeo as Dr. Meredith Grey
 Sandra Oh as Dr. Cristina Yang
 Justin Chambers as Dr. Alex Karev
 Chandra Wilson as Dr. Miranda Bailey
 James Pickens Jr. as Dr. Richard Webber
 Sara Ramirez as Dr. Callie Torres
 Kevin McKidd as Dr. Owen Hunt
 Jessica Capshaw as Dr. Arizona Robbins
 Sarah Drew as Dr. April Kepner
 Jesse Williams as Dr. Jackson Avery
 Camilla Luddington as Dr. Jo Wilson
 Gaius Charles as Dr. Shane Ross
 Jerrika Hinton as Dr. Stephanie Edwards
 Tessa Ferrer as Dr. Leah Murphy
 Patrick Dempsey as Dr. Derek Shepherd

Recurring 
 Caterina Scorsone as Dr. Amelia Shepherd
 Kelly McCreary as Dr. Maggie Pierce
 Jason George as Dr. Ben Warren
 Debbie Allen as Dr. Catherine Avery
 James Remar as Jimmy Evans 
 Justin Bruening as Matthew Taylor
 Marguerite Moreau as Dr. Emma Marling
 Nicole Cummins as Paramedic Nicole
 Rebecca Field as Sabine McNeil
 Thomas Barbusca as Link McNeil 
 Armani Jackson as Braden Morris
 Jadin Gould as Ivy McNeil
 Harley Graham as Francesca "Frankie" McNeil
 Billy Malone as Jon McNeil
 Elizabeth Bond as Kimmie Kepner
 Emily Happe as Libby Kepner
 Grace Bannon as Alice Kepner

Notable guests 
 Isaiah Washington as Dr. Preston Burke
 Tina Majorino as Dr. Heather Brooks 
 Bobby Campo as Brian
 Heather Hemmens as Sasha
 Héctor Elizondo as Carlos Torres
 Patrick Fabian as Dr. Oliver Lebackes
 Gordon Clapp as Victor Kaufman
 Paul James as Eric
 Valerie Mahaffey as Donna Kaufman
 Keke Palmer as Cheryl Jeffries
 Lainie Kazan as C.J.
 Annie Potts as Joyce Bosco

Production

Development 
Grey's Anatomy was renewed for a tenth season on May 10, 2013. This season is to include the 200th episode of the series, the fourth episode to air, "Puttin' on the Ritz". This season was also split into 2 batches of episodes, each batch consisting of 12 uninterrupted episodes (excluding holidays). The mid-season premiere aired on February 27, 2014.

Casting 
In May 2012, it was announced that 6 original castmates - Ellen Pompeo, Sandra Oh, Justin Chambers, Chandra Wilson, James Pickens, Jr. and Patrick Dempsey had renewed their contracts through season 10, as Meredith Grey, Cristina Yang, Alex Karev, Miranda Bailey, Richard Webber and Derek Shepherd respectively. It was revealed in June 2013, that 4 out of the 5 interns from Season 9 would be returning as series-regulars, including Camilla Luddington, Gaius Charles, Jerrika Hinton and Tessa Ferrer. It was announced in July 2013 that Bobby Campo and Heather Hemmens were slated to guest star in the 2-part season premiere. In August 2013, TVGuide reported that Dexter alum James Remar is set for a "mysterious" story-arc. It was later revealed that Remar would be playing Alex Karev's drug addict father, whom he hasn't seen in more than 20 years. In October 2013, it was announced that Hector Elizondo would be returning to the show, as Callie Torres' father, for a 'Callie-centric' episode that would air mid-November. Other guest stars in November were Valerie Mahaffey and Gordon Clapp.

It was announced in January 2014 that Nickelodeon star Keke Palmer would guest star in an upcoming episode slated to air in March 2014. It was also announced that Greek alum Paul James had been cast in a potentially recurring role. It was also announced in January that the role of Zola (Meredith and Derek's daughter) was recast and would now be played by Heaven White, who is significantly older than Jela K. Moore, the actress who previously played Zola.

On March 6, 2014, it was revealed that Isaiah Washington would reprise his role as Preston Burke for 1 episode in May 2014. It is believed that his reappearance will have ties with Cristina Yang's (Sandra Oh) departure from the show after 9 years. Dr. Burke was Cristina Yang's love-interest for much of his 3 years on the show. Washington was fired 7 years ago after he made a homophobic slur against castmate, T. R. Knight. On March 18, 2014, it was announced that another Grey's Anatomy alum would return in May and stay until the end of the season. Caterina Scorsone will return to play Amelia Shepherd, one of Derek's 4 sisters. Scorsone was a regular on the Grey's Anatomy spin-off, Private Practice, where she also portrayed Amelia Shepherd.

In April, news broke that Kelly McCreary would guest star in the Season 10 finale. It wasn't known until the season finale aired that her character, Dr. Pierce, was hired by Dr. Yang to be the new head of cardio. It was also discovered at the end of the episode that Dr. Ellis Grey was her birth mother.

On August 13, 2013, Sandra Oh revealed that after the tenth season, she would be leaving Grey's Anatomy. It was announced on March 25, 2014, that Gaius Charles and Tessa Ferrer were not having their options picked up for Season 11, meaning that Season 10 would be their last season as regulars on the show. On January 23, 2014, it was announced that Ellen Pompeo and Patrick Dempsey had renewed their contracts for another 2 seasons, as Meredith Grey and Derek Shepherd respectively, meaning their characters will be staying on the medical drama for seasons 11 and 12. On May 2, 2014, it was announced that the rest of the 6 original castmates, Justin Chambers, Chandra Wilson, and James Pickens Jr., excluding Sandra Oh, had renewed their contracts for another 2 seasons (11 and 12). Sara Ramirez also renewed her contract for another 2 seasons.

Reception

Ratings 
Grey's Anatomy's tenth season opened up to 9.27 million viewers with a 3.4/9 Nielsen rating/share in the 18–49 demographic. "Everybody's Crying Mercy" served as the season's most-viewed episode. "Man On The Moon" was the season's least-viewed episode, with 7.02 million viewers and a 2.3/6 Nielsen rating/share in the 18-49 demographic. At the time, the season finale was the series lowest-watched season finale with 8.92 million viewers and 2.6/8 in the 18-49 rating demo. Grey's Anatomy, in its tenth season, ranked #15 overall in total viewers (12.12 million). This is 11 spots higher than the previous season, which was ranked #26. In the 18-49 key demographic, Grey's Anatomy ranked #5. The last time a season of Grey's Anatomy was ranked #5 in the 18-49 key demographic was season 1. The highest ranking for the 18-49 key demographic was #3 for seasons 3, 4, and 5. Last season, Grey's Anatomy was ranked #10. For the 2013-2014 primetime TV schedule, Grey's Anatomy was the #1 drama in the 18-49 key demographic.

Live + SD ratings

Live + 7 Day (DVR) ratings

Critical response 

The tenth season of the medical-drama received positive reviews from the critics with many referring to the season as a return to form for the long-running show. The season holds a 100% positive score on Rotten Tomatoes and a "Fresh" rating. Annie Barett of Entertainment Weekly gave a positive review to the season and wrote, "There's true sorrow here along with the passion, which keeps their dynamic so intriguing to me."

The A.V. Club also praised the tenth season of the show stating, "At its best, Grey's Anatomy is about everyday bravery, sacrifice, and courage. At its worst, it's a melodramatic, moralizing soap opera. Both sides are on display as the show heads confidently into its tenth season."

The Loop also acknowledged the return to form giving a positive review, "After a shaky start to its tenth season, Grey's Anatomy has picked up the pace over the past 2 episodes and is once again showing a great deal of promise that it can revive itself after nearly a decade on the air."

Many sources, including Rachel Simon of Bustle and Nicole Pomarico of Wetpaint, claimed that Sandra Oh's performance during her tenth and final season on Grey's Anatomy is worthy of an Emmy nomination. Simon stated "She made us care about Grey’s in a way we hadn’t in years, bringing us into Cristina’s life and mind, fully and ferociously. The show has been good for several seasons now; because of Oh’s performance this year, it once again became great."

On Oh's exit Entertainment Weekly wrote, "Cristina and Meredith is the friendship to end all friendships—some would even argue it’s what the show is about. Cristina is Meredith’s person. How could she possibly function without Cristina in her life? More than that, Cristina on her own was a great character. She didn’t want kids, she didn’t need a man, and she’d rather receive compliments on her brain instead of her beauty. She was everything we needed in a character—and more. Seeing her go was devastating."

DVD release

References

2013 American television seasons
2014 American television seasons
Grey's Anatomy seasons